The Crotaphytidae, or collared lizards, are a family of desert-dwelling reptiles native to the Southwestern United States and northern Mexico. Alternatively they are recognized as a subfamily, Crotaphytinae, within the clade Pleurodonta. They are very fast-moving animals, with long limbs and tails; some species are capable of achieving  bipedal running at top speed. This species is carnivorous, feeding mainly on insects and smaller lizards.

The two genera contain 12 species.

Technical characters
Femoral pores present
Interparietal scale small (distinctly smaller than ear opening)
Never have an enlarged middorsal scale row or fringe
Never have a divided rostral scale
No bony spines or projecting ridges on their heads
No scales projecting over their ears, and no scales forming a prominent fringe on sides of toes as in Phrynosomatidae

Species
Genus Gambelia  (leopard lizards)
Cope's leopard lizard – Gambelia copeii 
blunt-nosed leopard lizard – Gambelia sila  
long-nosed leopard lizard – Gambelia wislizenii 

Genus Crotaphytus  (collared lizards)
venerable collared lizard – Crotaphytus antiquus 
desert collared lizard – Crotaphytus bicinctores 
common collared lizard – Crotaphytus collaris 
Dickerson's collared lizard  – Crotaphytus dickersonae 
Grismer's collared lizard – Crotaphytus grismeri 
Eastern collared lizard – Crotaphytus insularis 
Sonoran collared lizard – Crotaphytus nebrius 
reticulated collared lizard – Crotaphytus reticulatus 
Baja collared lizard – Crotaphytus vestigium 

Nota bene: A binomial authority in parentheses indicates that the species was originally described in different genus.

References

Further reading
Frost DR, Etheridge RE (1989). A Phylogenetic Analysis and Taxonomy of Iguanian Lizards (Reptilia: Squamata) Univ. Kansas Mus. Nat. Hist. Misc. Publ. 81: 1-62. (Family Crotaphytidae, p. 36).
Smith HM, Brodie ED Jr (1982). Reptiles of North America: A Guide to Field Identification. New York: Golden Press. 240 pp. . (Subfamily Crotaphytinae, p. 106).

 
Lizard families
Lizards of North America
Reptiles of Mexico
Reptiles of the United States
Taxa named by Hobart Muir Smith